Blera eoa  is a species of hoverfly normally associated with pine trees in Northern Sweden and Siberia. It is very similar to Blera fallax, except that its abdomen is all black.

The larvae, typical rat-tailed maggots, normally develop in damp rot holes of felled or felled pine trees.

Distribution
Russia, Sweden.

References

Diptera of Europe
Diptera of Asia
Eristalinae
Insects described in 1928
Taxa named by Aleksandr Stackelberg